R. Margabandhu is an Indian politician and former Member of the Legislative Assembly of Tamil Nadu. He was elected to the Tamil Nadu legislative assembly as an Anna Dravida Munnetra Kazhagam candidate from Anaicut constituency in 1977 election.

References 

All India Anna Dravida Munnetra Kazhagam politicians
Living people
Rajya Sabha members from Tamil Nadu
Year of birth missing (living people)